The XVIII Airborne Corps is a corps of the United States Army that has been in existence since 1942 and saw extensive service during World War II. The corps is designed for rapid deployment anywhere in the world and is referred to as "America's Contingency Corps." Its headquarters are at Fort Bragg, North Carolina.

XVIII Airborne Corps returned to Fort Bragg in October 2022 after a nine month deployment to Germany, in support of NATO and European Allies and partners. The mission was to provide a joint task force-capable headquarters in light of the 2022 Russian invasion of Ukraine.

Leadership
Its command group includes:
 Commanding General: Lieutenant General Christopher T. Donahue
 Deputy Commanding General: Major General Brian J. Mennes
 Deputy Commanding General (Operations): Brigadier General Robert (Bob) T. Richie, Canadian Army
 Chief of Staff: Colonel Kenneth Cole
 Command Sergeant Major: Command Sergeant Major Thomas “TJ" Holland

History

World War II
The corps was first activated on 17 January 1942, five weeks after the entry of the United States into World War II, as the II Armored Corps at Camp Polk, Louisiana, under the command of Major General William Henry Harrison Morris, Jr. When the concept of armored corps proved unnecessary, II Armored Corps was re-designated as XVIII Corps on 9 October 1943 at the Presidio of Monterey, California.

XVIII Corps deployed to Europe on 17 August 1944 and became the XVIII Airborne Corps on 25 August 1944 at Ogbourne St. George, England, assuming command of the 82nd and 101st Airborne Divisions, as part of the preparation for Operation Market Garden. Prior to this time, the two divisions were assigned to VII Corps and jumped into Normandy during Operation Overlord, the Allied invasion of Normandy, as part of VII Corps.

Major General Matthew Bunker Ridgway, a highly professional, competent and experienced airborne commander who had led the 82nd Airborne Division in Sicily, Italy and Normandy, was chosen to command the corps, which then consisted of the 82nd and 101st Airborne Divisions and was part of the newly created First Allied Airborne Army.

The corps headquarters did not see service in Operation Market Garden, with the British I Airborne Corps being chosen instead to exercise operational command of all Allied airborne forces in the operation, including the 82nd and 101st Airborne Divisions.

Following the Battle of the Bulge, in which the corps played a significant part (and which, during the early stages of the battle, the corps was commanded by Major General James M. Gavin of the 82nd Airborne), all American airborne units on the Western Front fell under command of the corps. XVIII Airborne Corps planned and executed Operation Varsity, the airborne component of Operation Plunder, the crossing of the River Rhine into Germany. It was one of the largest airborne operations of the war, with the British 6th and U.S. 17th Airborne Divisions under command.

After taking part in the Western Allied invasion of Germany, the XVIII Airborne Corps, still under Ridgway, returned to the United States in June 1945 and was initially to take part in the invasion of Japan, codenamed Operation Downfall. However, the Japanese surrendered just weeks later and XVIII Airborne Corps was inactivated on 15 October 1945 at Fort Campbell, Kentucky.

World War II units
 1st Infantry Division — 26 January 1945 – 12 February 1945.
 4th Infantry Division
 8th Infantry Division — 26 January 1945 – 10 July 1945.
 17th Airborne Division — 12 August 1944 – 1 January 1945; 15 February 1945 – 24 March 1945.
 29th Infantry Division
 30th Infantry Division — 21 December 1944 – 3 February 1945.
 34th Infantry Division
 75th Infantry Division — 29 December 1944 – 2 January 1945; 7 January 1945.
 78th Infantry Division — 3 February 1945 – 12 February 1945.
 82nd Airborne Division — 12 August 1944 – 17 September 1944; 19 December 1944 – 14 February 1945; 30 April 1945 – 3 January 1946.
 84th Infantry Division — 20 December 1944 – 21 December 1944.
 86th Infantry Division — 5 April 1945 – 22 April 1945.
 89th Infantry Division
 97th Infantry Division — 10 April 1945 – 22 April 1945.
 101st Airborne Division — 12 August 1944 – 21 September 1944; 28 February 1945 – 1 April 1945.
 106th Infantry Division — 20 December 1944 – 6 February 1945.
 3rd Armored Division — 19 December 1944 – 23 December 1944.
 5th Armored Division — 4 May 1945 – 10 October 1945.
 7th Armored Division — 20 December 1944 – 29 January 1945; 30 April 1945 – 9 October 1945.
 13th Armored Division — 10 April 1945 – 22 April 1945.

Cold War 
The Corps was reactivated at Fort Bragg on 21 May 1951 under the command of Major General John W. Leonard. Since then, the corps has been the primary strategic response force, with subordinate units participating in over a dozen major operations (listed below) in both combat and humanitarian roles, primarily in Central America and the CENTCOM area of responsibility.

In 1958 the XVIII Airborne Corps was given the additional mission of becoming the Strategic Army Corps. The corps was now tasked, in addition, to provide a flexible strike capability that could deploy worldwide, on short notice, without a declaration of an emergency. The 4th Infantry Division at Fort Lewis, Washington, and the 101st Airborne Division at Fort Campbell, Kentucky, were designated as STRAC's first-line divisions, while the 1st Infantry Division at Fort Riley, Kansas, and the 82nd Airborne Division at Fort Bragg were to provide backup in the event of general war. The 5th Logistical Command (later inactivated), also at Fort Bragg, would provide the corps with logistics support, while Fort Bragg's XVIII Airborne Corps Artillery would control artillery units.

The Corps deployed forces to the United States occupation of the Dominican Republic ('Operation Power Pack') in 1965.

The Corps deployed forces to the Vietnam War, including the entire 101st Airborne Division and the 3rd Brigade of the 82nd Airborne division.

In 1967 elements of the Corps were deployed to Detroit to suppress riots, and also to The Congo to support the government there and to rescue civilian hostages as part of Operation Dragon Rouge.

In 1982 the Corps first rotated elements to the Sinai Peninsula as part of the Multinational Force and Observers (UN) to guarantee the Camp David Peace Accords.

In 1983 elements of the Corps were deployed to the island of Grenada as part of Operation Urgent Fury, with the stated goal of reestablishing the democratically elected government.

In 1989 XVIII Airborne Corps, commanded by then LTG Carl Stiner, participated in the invasion of Panama in Operation Just Cause. Stiner served concurrently as Commander of Joint Task Force South.

Structure in 1989 

At the end of the Cold War in 1989 the corps consisted of the following formations and units:

 XVIII Airborne Corps, Fort Bragg, North Carolina
 Headquarters & Headquarters Company
 18th Personnel Group
 18th Finance Group
 1st Battalion, 2nd Air Defense Artillery, Fort Stewart
 10th Mountain Division (Light), Fort Drum, New York
 24th Infantry Division (Mechanized), Fort Stewart, Georgia
 82nd Airborne Division, Fort Bragg, North Carolina
 101st Airborne Division (Air Assault), Fort Campbell, Kentucky
 XVIII Airborne Corps Artillery, Fort Bragg
 18th Field Artillery Brigade (Airborne), Fort Bragg
 Headquarters & Headquarters Battery
 3rd Battalion, 8th Field Artillery (24 × M198 155mm towed howitzer)
 5th Battalion, 8th Field Artillery (24 × M198 155mm towed howitzer)
 3rd Battalion, 27th Field Artillery (27 × M270 Multiple Launch Rocket System)
 1st Battalion, 39th Field Artillery (Airborne) (24 × M198 155mm towed howitzer)
 1st Field Artillery Detachment (Target Acquisition)
 18th Aviation Brigade (Airborne), Fort Bragg
 Headquarters & Headquarters Company
 1st Battalion, 58th Aviation (Air Traffic Control)
 1st Battalion, 159th Aviation (General Support)
 2nd Battalion, 159th Aviation (Medium Lift)
 3rd Battalion, 159th Aviation (Attack)
 2nd Battalion, 229th Aviation (Attack) (former 2nd Battalion, 101st Aviation)
 20th Engineer Brigade (Airborne), Fort Bragg
 27th Engineer Battalion (Airborne)
 30th Engineer Battalion (Topographic)
 37th Engineer Battalion (Airborne)
 175th Engineer Company
 264th Engineer Company (Bridge)
 362nd Engineer Company
 16th Military Police Brigade (Airborne), Fort Bragg
 503rd Military Police Battalion (Airborne)
 35th Signal Brigade (Airborne), Fort Bragg
 25th Signal Battalion (Corps Area)
 50th Signal Battalion (Corps Command Operations) (Airborne)
 327th Signal Battalion (Corps Radio)
 426th Signal Battalion (Corps Area)
 525th Military Intelligence Brigade (Airborne), Fort Bragg
 224th Military Intelligence Battalion (Aerial Exploitation), Hunter Army Airfield, Georgia
 319th Military Intelligence Battalion (Operations)
 519th Military Intelligence Battalion (Tactical Exploitation) (Airborne)
 1st Corps Support Command (Airborne), Fort Bragg 
subordination formations and units

Desert Storm 
In 1991, XVIII Airborne Corps participated in the Persian Gulf War. The corps was responsible for securing VII Corps' northern flank against a possible Iraqi counterattack. Along with the 82nd and 101st Airborne Divisions, 24th Infantry Division and 3rd Armored Cavalry Regiment, XVIII Airborne Corps also gained operational control of the French 6th Light Armor Division (LAD) (which also included units from the French Foreign Legion).

During Operations Desert Shield and Desert Storm, XVIII Airborne Corps Artillery consisted of the 3d Battalion, 8th Field Artillery; 5th Battalion, 8th Field Artillery; and the 1st Battalion (Airborne), 39th Field Artillery. The living quarters for these three units were situated between the 82d Airborne Division and the Special Forces at Fort Bragg. Of the three units, only 1-39th was airborne qualified and served as the only fully airborne deployable 155 mm Field Artillery unit in history. The 1-39th FA and 3-8th FA were key components of the thrust into Iraq in the first Gulf War, providing fire support for the French Foreign Legion and the 82nd Airborne Division.

The 5th Battalion, 8th Field Artillery also served in a major support role for 82d and French troops during the Gulf War. It consisted of three individual batteries. Batteries A and B were Airborne-qualified, while Battery C was air assault. Batteries A and B were assigned to Fort Bragg, North Carolina and Battery C was assigned to Fort Campbell, Kentucky. All of the battalions were subsequently re-flagged during the years following the Gulf War.

Task Force 118 had flown the OH-58D Kiowa Warrior off naval vessels during Operation Prime Chance in the 1980s, operating against Iran in the Persian Gulf. It was redesignated the 4th Squadron, 17th Cavalry on 15 January 1991. During the Gulf War of 1991 it was part of the 18th Aviation Brigade.

Major formations, 1950–2006
The 82nd and 101st Airborne Divisions have served with the corps since the 1950s. The 24th Infantry Division (Mechanized) was 'reflagged' as the 3rd Infantry Division (Mechanized) in April 1996.

 7th Infantry Division (Light)
 10th Mountain Division (Light Infantry)
 XVIII Airborne Corps Artillery
 18th Field Artillery Brigade
 1st Sustainment Command (Theater)
 35th Signal Brigade
 18th Aviation Brigade (no longer active)
 20th Engineer Brigade
 525th Battlefield Surveillance Brigade
 108th Air Defense Artillery Brigade
 16th Military Police Brigade
 44th Medical Command
 additional smaller, National Guard, and Reserve units

21st century

The Corps headquarters was deployed to Afghanistan from May 2002 – 2003, and became Combined Joint Task Force 180 for the deployment.

XVIII Airborne Corps was deployed from January 2005 to January 2006 to Baghdad, Iraq, where it served as the Multi-National Corps – Iraq. Following its return, XVIII Airborne Corps and its subordinate units began the process of modernization and reorganization.

Under the previous Army Chief of Staff's future restructure of the Army, the corps headquarters of the XVIII Airborne Corps will lose its airborne (specifically parachute) certification as a cost-cutting measure—the same will occur to the divisional headquarters of the 82nd Airborne Division. This plan is designed to follow the U.S. Army's restructuring plan to go from being division-based to brigade-based. This will mean that the largest units that will be airborne – specifically parachute certified – will be at the brigade level. Even so, for traditional and historical reasons, the formation will continue to be called the XVIII Airborne Corps.

The divisions that fall under the XVIII Airborne Corps (as well as the other two corps in the Army) are in a period of transition, shifting from corps control to fall directly under FORSCOM, eliminating the corps status as a middle man. This ties in with the Army's broad modularity plan, as a corps can deploy and support any unit, not just the units subordinate to the corps. The 3d Infantry Division, the 10th Mountain Division (Light Infantry), and the 101st Airborne Division (Air Assault) have already changed over to direct FORSCOM control. The 82nd Airborne Division will transfer after the division returns from Afghanistan.

In August 2006, XVIII Airborne Corps traveled to South Korea to participate in Ulchi Focus Lens, a joint training exercise between the Republic of Korea Army and coalition forces stationed there.

In mid-April, 2007, the Department of the Army confirmed the next OIF deployment schedule, with XVIII Airborne Corps deploying to relieve III Corps as the MNC-I at Camp Victory, Baghdad, Iraq. XVIII Airborne Corps is scheduled to replace III Corps in November, 2007. The corps will deploy along with 1st Armored Division and 4th Infantry Division, as well as 1st Brigade Combat Team, 10th Mountain Division, and 1st BCT, 82nd Airborne Division.

On 21 December 2016, Stars and Stripes reported that in August the XVIII Airborne Corps deployed to Iraq for Operation Inherent Resolve, in December this included the XVIII Airborne Corps headquarters and the 1st Special Forces Command, which is deployed as the Special Operations Joint Task Force – Operation Inherent Resolve. The 18th Field Artillery Brigade deployed into Iraq with High Mobility Artillery Rocket Systems.

A Canadian Army General has served with the XVIII Corps since 2007.

Current structure

 XVIII Airborne Corps, Fort Bragg
 3rd Infantry Division, Fort Stewart
 10th Mountain Division, Fort Drum
 82nd Airborne Division, Fort Bragg
 101st Airborne Division, Fort Campbell
 3rd Sustainment Command (Expeditionary), Fort Bragg
 7th Transportation Brigade, Fort Eustis
 16th Military Police Brigade, Fort Bragg
 83rd Civil Affairs Battalion, Fort Bragg (Administratively assigned, operationally controlled by XVIII Airborne Corps)
 18th Field Artillery Brigade, Fort Bragg
 20th Engineer Brigade, Fort Bragg
 35th Signal Brigade, Fort Gordon
 44th Medical Brigade, Fort Bragg
 525th Expeditionary Military Intelligence Brigade, Fort Bragg
Other supporting units:
 52nd Ordnance Group (EOD), Fort Campbell and Fort Bragg, part of 20th CBRNE Command
 108th Air Defense Artillery Brigade, Fort Bragg, part of 32nd Army Air & Missile Defense Command
 18th Air Support Operations Group, Pope Field (United States Air Force unit responsible for coordinating corps tactical air support)

Operations
The corps has participated in a number of operations since then:
 Operation Power Pack – Dominican Republic, 1965
 Operation Urgent Fury – Grenada, 1983
 Operation Golden Pheasant – Honduras, 1988
 Operation Nimrod Dancer – Panama, 1989
 Operation Hawkeye – U.S. Virgin Islands, 1989
 Operation Just Cause – Panama, 1989
 Operation Desert Shield – Saudi Arabia, 1990–1991
 Operation Desert Storm – Saudi Arabia, Kuwait and Iraq, 1991
 Operation GTMO – Cuba, 1991
 Operation Hurricane Andrew – Florida, 1992
 Operation Restore Hope – Somalia, 1992
 Operation Uphold/Maintain Democracy – Haiti, 1994
 Operation Vigilant Warrior – Kuwait, 1994
 Operation Joint Forge – Bosnia, 1998
 Operation Enduring Freedom – Afghanistan, 2002, 2014
 Operation Iraqi Freedom – Iraq, 2005
 Operation Iraqi Freedom – Iraq, 2008
 Operation Unified Response – Haiti, 2010
 Operation New Dawn – Iraq, 2011
 Operation Inherent Resolve – Iraq and Syria, 2015–2016

Notable members
 John D. Altenburg, MG – Deputy Judge Advocate General of the U.S. Army.
 Lloyd Austin, GEN — Commanding General of XVIII Airborne Corps, Commanding General of CENTCOM, 28th United States Secretary of Defense.
 Ralph Eaton, BG – 82nd Airborne Division and XVIII Airborne Corps Chief of Staff.
 Michael C. Flowers, BG – Commander, Joint POW/MIA Accounting Command.
 Michael T. Flynn, LTG – 25th National Security Advisor, Director of the Defense Intelligence Agency, and ISAF Commander.
 Charles D. Gemar, LTC – US Astronaut.
 Teresa King, SGM – First female Commandant of the U.S. Army Drill Sergeant Academy.
 Gary Luck, GEN - Corps commander and later CG, USFK
 Stanley A. McChrystal, GEN – ISAF Commander.
 Raymond T. Odierno, GEN – 38th Army Chief of Staff.
 James Peake, LTG – Secretary of Veterans Affairs.
 David Petraeus, GEN – ISAF Commander and Director of the Central Intelligence Agency.
 Matthew Ridgway, GEN - U.S. Army Chief of Staff
 David M. Rodriguez, GEN – Commander, U.S. Africa Command and FORSCOM.
 Arthur D. Simons, COL – Led the Son Tay raid during the Vietnam War.
 Thomas Tackaberry, LTG - Veteran of World War II, Korea and Vietnam.
 Michael Tomczyk, CPT – Computer entrepreneur and joint developer of the VIC-20.
 Thomas R. Turner II, LTG – Commanding General of United States Army North.
 James C. Yarbrough, BG – Commander, Joint Readiness Training Center at Fort Polk.
 Wayne Eyre, GEN – Commander of the Canadian Army and Chief of Defence Staff.

References

External links
 
 Global Security: XVIII Airborne Corps
 XVIII Airborne Corps Desert Storm/Desert Shield Photographs US Army Heritage and Education Center, Carlisle, Pennsylvania

18
18
018
018
018
1942 establishments in Louisiana